The 2021 Asian Karate Championships were the 17th edition of the Senior Asian Karate Championship and were held in Almaty, Kazakhstan from 20 to 22, December 2021. The event was held at the Baluan Sholak Sports Palace.

Medalists

Men

Women

Medal table

References

External links
 Official International Calendar 2021 of Sports Karate 
 Official Website of Asian Karate Federation (AKF) 
 Results book

Asian Karate Championships
Asian Championships
Sports competitions in Almaty
Asian Karate Championships
Karate